Monocoptopera is a genus of moths of the family Crambidae. It contains only one species, Monocoptopera ecmetallescens, which is found on Ambon Island.

References

Natural History Museum Lepidoptera genus database

Pyraustinae
Crambidae genera
Monotypic moth genera
Taxa named by George Hampson